Kaldarovo (Qaldar) is a rural locality (a village) and the administrative centre of Volostnovsky Selsoviet, Kugarchinsky District, Bashkortostan, Russia. The population was 322 as of 2010. There are 4 streets.

Geography 
Kaldarovo is located 30 km northwest of Mrakovo (the district's administrative centre) by road. Tyulyabayevo is the nearest rural locality.

References 

Rural localities in Kugarchinsky District